Gianni Riotta (born 1954 in Palermo, Italy) is an Italian journalist, a regular contributor for the daily newspaper La Stampa and a former editor-in-chief of the financial newspaper Il Sole 24 Ore,  Rai 3 and the news bulletin TG1.  He has contributed to the Washington Post, Le Monde, Foreign Policy, and the New York Times. Riotta also has U.S. citizenship.

Riotta sits on the Advisory Council of the Department of French and Italian at Princeton University. He also collaborates with IMT School for Advanced Studies Lucca.

He received the America Award of the Italy-USA Foundation in 2013.  Riotta is a member of the Council on Foreign Relations.

Bibliography
NY, on the September 11 attacks.
Global War, essays on the Iraq War
Prince of the Clouds (short-listed for the Prix Médicis)

References

External links

The Coming Identity War Foreign Policy SEPTEMBER 1, 2000
Books by Gianni Riotta
Riotta interview of George W. Bush

Italian male journalists
Foreign policy writers
Living people
Journalists from Palermo
1954 births